Jesús Guzmán Delgado (born 30 May 1957) is a Spanish racing cyclist. He rode in the 1980 Tour de France.

References

External links
 

1957 births
Living people
Spanish male cyclists
Place of birth missing (living people)
Sportspeople from the Province of Granada
Cyclists from Andalusia